Olivier De Cock (born 9 November 1975) is a Belgian former professional footballer who played as a right-back. He is manager of the reserve team of R. Knokke FC.

Club career
De Cock was born in Eeklo. He joined Club Brugge in 1987. In 1995, he was promoted to the first team. De Cock made his debut for the club on 29 November 1996 in a 3–1 league win over Gent. However, it was only after the departure of Eric Deflandre that De Cock got a permanent spot in the starting lineup. When Brian Priske arrived in 2006, he lost his permanent place in the side.

In August 2007 he moved to Fortuna Düsseldorf on loan. He then played for Rot-Weiß Oberhausen and Oostende. In the summer of 2010, he joined Roeselare on a one-year contract. After that season, De Cock retired as a professional football player. He then started playing on amateur level for SVV Damme.

International career
De Cock earned 11 caps for the Belgium national team. His first game for them came against Andorra on 12 October 2002 in a 1–0 victory.

Coaching career
In January 2018, De Cock was appointed team manager of his former club Roeselare. In the summer 2018, he was hired as the manager of K.V. Oostende's U11 team.

On 22 April 2019, he was appointed manager of the reserve team of R. Knokke FC.

Career statistics

Honours
Club Brugge
Belgian First Division A: 2002–03, 2004–05
Belgian Super Cup: 2002, 2003, 2005

References

External links
 
 

1975 births
Living people
People from Eeklo
Belgian footballers
Association football defenders
Belgium international footballers
2. Bundesliga players
Club Brugge KV players
Fortuna Düsseldorf players
Rot-Weiß Oberhausen players
K.V. Oostende players
K.S.V. Roeselare players
Belgian expatriate footballers
Belgian expatriate sportspeople in Germany
Expatriate footballers in Germany
Footballers from East Flanders